Panchari Melam is a percussion ensemble, performed during temple festivals in Kerala, India. Panchari Melam (or simply panchari), is one of the major forms of Chenda Melam (ethnic drum ensemble), and is the best-known and most popular in the kshetram vadyam (temple percussion) genre. Panchari Melam, comprising instruments like Chenda, Ilathalam, Kombu and Kuzhal, is performed during many temple festivals in central Kerala, where it is presented in arguably the most classical manner. Panchari is also traditionally performed, albeit with a touch of subtle regional difference, in north Kerala (Malabar) and south-central Kerala (Kochi). Of late, its charm has led to its performance even in temples in Kerala's deep south.

Panchari is a six-beat thaalam (taal) with equivalents like Roopakam in south Indian Carnatic music and Daadra in the northern Hindustani classical.

Another Chenda Melam which comes close to Panchari in prominence and grammatical soundness, is Pandi Melam, performed outside temple precincts in general. Other Chenda Melams, though less popular, are Chempata, Adanta, Anchatanta, Dhruvam, Chempha, Navam, Kalpam and Ekadasam. Though there are expressional differences between the Panchari and the above-mentioned Melams (other than Pandi), the description of the former is prototypical for the rest of them.

Panchari Melam is performed either in its elaborate form (during annual temple festivals) or in its sketchy detail (to accompany the daily or weekly temple rituals). 

The ensemble starts at the main entrance to the inner part of the temple, slowly circling the shrine clockwise while playing. A panchari melam has five stages, each of them based on beats totalling 96, 48, 24, 12 and 6 respectively. The first phase of the Panchari Melam, also called the "Pathikaalam" stands out for its unique blend of percussion and notes from the Kuzhal. The crescendo rises higher with each phase, eventually culminating in the fifth phase with a 6-beat cycle. For the culmination of the fifth phase, a unique 3-beat cycle called "Muri-Panchari" is also employed to take the Melam to an apt conclusion. The Melam thus starts with a broad base, and progresses completing the pyramid structure, culminating at the apex.

The semi-circular procession, with caparisoned elephants (totalling anywhere from three up to fifteen), is led by the deity of the temple carried by the male elephant in the centre. (Ritualistically the idol is carried by the Namboodiri priest himself). The deity is kept facing the musical ensemble and devotees/Melam buffs, with the latter surrounding the musicians and following the progress of the melam.

Major venues
Panchari melam, in its grand classical form, is staged during temple festivals in and around Thrissur and Ernakulam districts . Tripunithura Sree Poornathrayesa Temple  Vrischikolsavam is considered one of the best venues of Panchari Melam where one can encounter Panchari Melams at its sublime best. Irinjalakkuda Koodalmanikyam Temple's annual festival is also another renowned venue for Panchari Melam. Peruvanam Pooram, Arattupuzha Pooram, Kuttanellur Pooram, Edakkunni Uthram Vilakku,  Kuzhur Subrahmanya Swamy Temple, Ernakulathappan Temple are some of the other known venues of pancharimelam .

Leading masters
Among the leading masters of Panchari melam today are Peruvanam Kuttan Marar, kizhakoot Aniyan Marar, Madathil Narayanankutty Marar, Kelath Aravindan Marar, Mattannur Sankarankutty Marar, Thiruvalla Radhakrishnan Marar, Pazhuvil Raghu Marar, vellithiruthy unni nair , Cheranallore Shankarankutty Marar, Peruvanam Satheesan Marar, Kelath Prabhakaran Marar, Karimpuzha Gopi Poduval, Cherussery Kuttan Marar, Kanhangad Muraleedhara Marar, Payyavoor Narayana Marar, Chowalloor Mohanan nair, iringapuram babu, Guruvayoor Haridas, RLV Mahesh, Cheruthazham Achuthananda Marar, Chittannur Madhusoodhanan Marar, Peruvanam Prakashan Marar, Peruvanam Sankararnarayanan Marar, Chendamangalam Unnikrishna Marar and Kalamandalam Sivadasan, Cherussery Sreekumar Marar. Kodakara unni, Thrithala Sreeni Poduval, Mannarkkad Haridas Marar, Mannarkkad Mohandas Marar, kalamandalam sivadas

Late panchari melam masters of the recent past include Late Shri Pandarathil Kuttappa Marar, Peruvanam Narayana Marar, Peruvanam Appu Marar, Kumarapurathu Appu Marar, Chakkamkulam Appu Marar, Thrippekulam Achutha Marar, Late Madathil GopalaMarar, Karimpuzha Rama Poduval, Mulangunnathukavu Appukutta Kurup, Pandarathil Murali, Kachamkurichi Kannan, Kuruppath Eachara Marar, Karekkattu Eachara Marar,  Pattirathu Sankara Marar and Makkoth Nanu Marar
The Great Thrimoorthies In All
Late :Shri Pandarathil Kuttappa Marar, Late:Makoth Sankaran kutty Marar, Anthikad Raman Kutty Marar.
Three of them learned the Thayambaka from Late Shri Thiyadi Naimbair.

See also
 Pandi Melam
 Panchavadyam
 Thayambaka

References

External links

 Melam Collections

Kerala music
Percussion ensembles
Indian musical groups
Hindu music
Culture of Kerala